Brigadier General Muscab Ahmed Qadaawe is a Somali military general. He is the incumbent Chief of the Somali Armed Forces.

Career
After finishing his secondary school education in 2000, Rageh enlisted in the Somali Army under the Transitional Federal Government. Shortly after enlisting Rageh was sent to Uganda for military training specifically VIP Protection. Once he was back in the country, he went on to provide basic training for new recruits.

In the year 2009, Odowaa was sent to Sudan for Officer training and came back in 2010 to be commissioned as a Lieutenant. Upon commission, he became one of the Officers in charge of Villa Somalia Protection.

In 2013, Rageh was sent to Turkey for special training that involved infantry commanding, foreign languages, and logistics of the Army. Shortly after coming back, Odowaa was then again sent back to Turkey in the end of 2014 to the Turkish Army War College where he spent the next two years learning and understanding the core principles of leading a modern army. Before he was sent to Turkey, Rageh was given the rank of Major.

Upon successfully completing his course at the Turkish Army War College, Rageh was appointed as head of 60th Platoon which was part of the Villa Somalia Protection.

Beginning of 2018, he became Lieutenant Colonel and towards the end of 2020
, he became head of Somali National Army Infantry with his new rank as Brigadier General.

Rageh survived an assassination attempt in July 2020.

Promotions

Chief of Army

On the 27th August 2020, Brigadier General Odowaa Yusuf Rageh was appointed as the Chief of the Army

References

Somalian military leaders
Living people
1987 births
Somalian generals